Borobudur, also transcribed Barabudur is a 9th-century Mahayana Buddhist temple in Magelang Regency, not far from the city of Magelang and the town of Muntilan, in Central Java, Indonesia. It is the world's largest Buddhist temple. The temple consists of nine stacked platforms, six square and three circular, topped by a central dome. It is decorated with 2,672 relief panels and originally 504 Buddha statues. The central dome is surrounded by 72 Buddha statues, each seated inside a perforated stupa.

Built in the 9th century during the reign of the Sailendra Dynasty, the temple design follows Javanese Buddhist architecture, which blends the Indonesian indigenous tradition of ancestor worship and the Buddhist concept of attaining nirvāṇa. The temple demonstrates the influences of Gupta art that reflects India's influence on the region, yet there are enough indigenous scenes and elements incorporated to make Borobudur uniquely Indonesian. The monument is a shrine to the Buddha and a place for Buddhist pilgrimage. The pilgrim journey begins at the base of the monument and follows a path around the monument, ascending to the top through three levels symbolic of Buddhist cosmology: Kāmadhātu (the world of desire), Rūpadhātu (the world of forms) and Arūpadhātu (the world of formlessness). The monument guides pilgrims through an extensive system of stairways and corridors with 1,460 narrative relief panels on the walls and the balustrades. Borobudur has one of the largest and most complete ensembles of Buddhist reliefs in the world.

Evidence suggests that Borobudur was constructed in the 9th century and subsequently abandoned following the 14th-century decline of Hindu kingdoms in Java and the Javanese conversion to Islam. Worldwide knowledge of its existence was sparked in 1814 by Sir Thomas Stamford Raffles, then the British ruler of Java, who was advised of its location by native Indonesians. Borobudur has since been preserved through several restorations. The largest restoration project was undertaken between 1975 and 1982 by the Indonesian government and UNESCO, followed by the monument's listing as a UNESCO World Heritage Site.

Borobudur is the largest Buddhist temple in the world, and ranks with Bagan in Myanmar and Angkor Wat in Cambodia as one of the great archeological sites of Southeast Asia. Borobudur remains popular for pilgrimage, with Buddhists in Indonesia celebrating Vesak Day at the monument. Borobudur is Indonesia's single most visited tourist attraction.

Etymology

In Indonesian, ancient temples are referred to as candi; thus locals refer to "Borobudur Temple" as Candi Borobudur. The term candi also loosely describes ancient structures, for example gates and baths. The origins of the name Borobudur, is derived from Boro for big and Budur for Buddha. The name Borobudur was first written in Raffles's book on Javan history. Raffles wrote about a monument called Borobudur, but there are no older documents suggesting the same name. The only old Javanese manuscript that hints the monument called Budur as a holy Buddhist sanctuary is Nagarakretagama, written by Mpu Prapanca, a Buddhist scholar of Majapahit court, in 1365.
Most candi are named after a nearby village. If it followed Javanese language conventions and was named after the nearby village of Bore, the monument should have been named "BudurBoro". Raffles thought that Budur might correspond to the modern Javanese word Buda ("ancient")—i.e., "ancient Boro". He also suggested that the name might derive from boro, meaning "great" or "honourable" and Budur for Buddha. However, another archaeologist suggests the second component of the name (Budur) comes from Javanese term bhudhara ("mountain").

Another possible etymology by Dutch archaeologist A.J. Bernet Kempers suggests that Borobudur is a corrupted simplified local Javanese pronunciation of Biara Beduhur written in Sanskrit as Vihara Buddha Uhr. The term Buddha-Uhr could mean "the city of Buddhas", while another possible term Beduhur is probably an Old Javanese term, still survived today in Balinese vocabulary, which means "a high place", constructed from the stem word dhuhur or luhur (high). This suggests that Borobudur means vihara of Buddha located on a high place or on a hill.

The construction and inauguration of a sacred Buddhist building—possibly a reference to Borobudur—was mentioned in two inscriptions, both discovered in Kedu, Temanggung Regency. The Karangtengah inscription, dated 824, mentioned a sacred building named Jinalaya (the realm of those who have conquered worldly desire and reached enlightenment), inaugurated by Pramodhawardhani, daughter of Samaratungga. The Tri Tepusan inscription, dated 842, is mentioned in the sima, the (tax-free) lands awarded by Çrī Kahulunnan (Pramodhawardhani) to ensure the funding and maintenance of a Kamūlān called Bhūmisambhāra. Kamūlān is from the word mula, which means "the place of origin", a sacred building to honor the ancestors, probably those of the Sailendras. Casparis suggested that Bhūmi Sambhāra Bhudhāra, which in Sanskrit means "the mountain of combined virtues of the ten stages of Boddhisattvahood", was the original name of Borobudur. Additionally, the term Borobudur is possibly derived from the Sanskrit term परमबुद्ध which mean "Param Buddha" or Supreme Buddha.

Location

The three temples

According to local myth, the area known as Kedu Plain is a Javanese "sacred" place and has been dubbed "the garden of Java" due to its high agricultural fertility.

During the restoration in the early 20th century, it was discovered that three Buddhist temples in the region, Borobudur, Pawon and Mendut, are positioned along a straight line. A ritual relationship between the three temples must have existed, although the exact ritual process is unknown.

Ancient lake hypothesis

Speculation about a surrounding lake's existence was the subject of intense discussion among archaeologists in the 20th century. In 1931, a Dutch artist and scholar of Hindu and Buddhist architecture, W.O.J. Nieuwenkamp, developed a hypothesis that the Kedu Plain was once a lake and Borobudur initially represented a lotus flower floating on the lake.

Dumarçay together with Professor Thanikaimoni took soil samples in 1974 and again in 1977 from trial trenches that had been dug into the hill, as well as from the plain immediately to the south. These samples were later analysed by Thanikaimoni, who examined their pollen and spore content to identify the type of vegetation that had grown in the area around the time of Borobudur's construction. They were unable to discover any pollen or spore samples that were characteristic of any vegetation known to grow in an aquatic environment such as a lake, pond or marsh. The area surrounding Borobudur appears to have been surrounded by agricultural land and palm trees at the time of the monument's construction, as is still the case today. Caesar Voûte and the geomorphologist Dr J.J. Nossin in 1985–86 field studies re-examined the Borobudur lake hypothesis and confirmed the absence of a lake around Borobudur at the time of its construction and active use as a sanctuary. These findings A New Perspective on Some Old Questions Pertaining to Borobudur were published in the 2005 UNESCO publication titled "The Restoration of Borobudur".

History

Construction

There are no known records of construction or the intended purpose of Borobudur. The duration of construction has been estimated by comparison of carved reliefs on the temple's hidden foot and the inscriptions commonly used in royal charters during the 8th and 9th centuries. Borobudur was likely founded around 800 AD. This corresponds to the period between 760 and 830 AD, the peak of the Sailendra dynasty rule over the Mataram kingdom in central Java, when their power encompassed not only the Srivijayan Empire but also southern Thailand, Indianized kingdoms of Philippines, North Malaya (Kedah, also known in Indian texts as the ancient Hindu state of Kadaram). The construction has been estimated to have taken 75 years with completion during the reign of Samaratungga in 825.

There is uncertainty about Hindu and Buddhist rulers in Java around that time. The Sailendras were known as ardent followers of Buddhism, though stone inscriptions found at Sojomerto also suggest they may have been Hindus. It was during this time that many Hindu and Buddhist monuments were built on the plains and mountains around the Kedu Plain. The Buddhist monuments, including Borobudur, were erected around the same period as the Hindu Shiva Prambanan temple compound.

Construction of Buddhist temples, including Borobudur, at that time was possible because Sanjaya's immediate successor, Rakai Panangkaran, granted his permission to the Buddhist followers to build such temples. In fact, to show his respect, Panangkaran gave the village of Kalasan to the Buddhist community, as is written in the Kalasan Charter dated 778 AD. This has led some archaeologists to believe that there was never serious conflict concerning religion in Java as it was possible for a Hindu king to patronize the establishment of a Buddhist monument; or for a Buddhist king to act likewise. The 856 battle on the Ratubaka plateau was much after and was a political battle. There was a climate of peaceful coexistence where Sailendra involvement exists in Lara Jonggrang.

Abandonment

Borobudur lay hidden for centuries under layers of volcanic ash and jungle growth. The facts behind its abandonment remain a mystery. It is not known when active use of the monument and Buddhist pilgrimage to it ceased. Sometime between 928 and 1006, King Mpu Sindok moved the capital of the Mataram Kingdom to the region of East Java after a series of volcanic eruptions; it is not certain whether this influenced the abandonment, but several sources mention this as the most likely period of abandonment. The monument is mentioned vaguely as late as  1365, in Mpu Prapanca's Nagarakretagama, written during the Majapahit era and mentioning "the vihara in Budur". Soekmono (1976) also mentions the popular belief that the temples were disbanded when the population converted to Islam in the 15th century.

The monument was not forgotten completely, though folk stories gradually shifted from its past glory into more superstitious beliefs associated with bad luck and misery. Two old Javanese chronicles (babad) from the 18th century mention cases of bad luck associated with the monument. According to the Babad Tanah Jawi (or the History of Java), the monument was a fatal factor for Mas Dana, a rebel who revolted against Pakubuwono I, the king of Mataram in 1709. It was mentioned that the "Redi Borobudur" hill was besieged and the insurgents were defeated and sentenced to death by the king. In the Babad Mataram (or the History of the Mataram Kingdom), the monument was associated with the misfortune of the crown prince of the Yogyakarta Sultanate in 1757. In spite of a taboo against visiting the monument, "he took such pity on 'the knight who was captured in a cage' (i.e. the statue in one of the perforated stupas) that he could not help coming to see his 'unfortunate friend. Upon returning to his palace, he fell ill and died one day later.

Rediscovery

Following its capture, Java was under British administration from 1811 to 1816. The appointed governor was Lieutenant Governor-General Thomas Stamford Raffles, who took great interest in the history of Java. He collected Javanese antiques and made notes through contacts with local inhabitants during his tour throughout the island. On an inspection tour to Semarang in 1814, he was informed about a big monument deep in a jungle near the village of Bumisegoro. He was not able to see the site himself, but sent , a Dutch engineer who, among other antiquity explorations had uncovered the Sewu complex in 1806–07, to investigate.
In two months, Cornelius and his 200 men cut down trees, burned down vegetation and dug away the earth to reveal the monument. Due to the danger of collapse, he could not unearth all galleries. He reported his findings to Raffles, including various drawings. Although Raffles mentioned the discovery and hard work by Cornelius and his men in only a few sentences, he has been credited with the monument's rediscovery, as the one who had brought it to the world's attention.

Christiaan Lodewijk Hartmann, the Resident of the Kedu region, continued Cornelius's work, and in 1835, the whole complex was finally unearthed. His interest in Borobudur was more personal than official. Hartmann did not write any reports of his activities, in particular, the alleged story that he discovered the large statue of Buddha in the main stupa. In 1842, Hartmann investigated the main dome, although what he discovered is unknown and the main stupa remains empty.

The Dutch East Indies government then commissioned Frans Carel Wilsen, a Dutch engineering official, who studied the monument and drew hundreds of relief sketches. Jan Frederik Gerrit Brumund was also appointed to make a detailed study of the monument, which was completed in 1859. The government intended to publish an article based on Brumund's study supplemented by Wilsen's drawings, but Brumund refused to cooperate. The government then commissioned another scholar, Conradus Leemans, who compiled a monograph based on Brumund's and Wilsen's sources. In 1873, the first monograph of the detailed study of Borobudur was published, followed by its French translation a year later. The first photograph of the monument was taken in 1872 by the Dutch-Flemish engraver Isidore van Kinsbergen.

Appreciation of the site developed slowly, and it served for some time largely as a source of souvenirs and income for "souvenir hunters" and thieves. In 1882, the chief inspector of cultural artifacts recommended that Borobudur be entirely disassembled with the relocation of reliefs into museums due to the unstable condition of the monument. As a result, the government appointed Willem Pieter Groeneveldt, curator of the archaeological collection of the Batavian Society of Arts and Sciences, to undertake a thorough investigation of the site and to assess the actual condition of the complex; his report found that these fears were unjustified and recommended it be left intact.

Borobudur was considered as the source of souvenirs, and parts of its sculptures were looted, some even with colonial-government consent. In 1896 King Chulalongkorn of Siam visited Java and requested and was allowed to take home eight cartloads of sculptures taken from Borobudur. These include thirty pieces taken from a number of relief panels, five buddha images, two lions, one gargoyle, several kala motifs from the stairs and gateways, and a guardian statue (dvarapala). Several of these artifacts, most notably the lions, dvarapala, kala, makara and giant waterspouts are now on display in the Java Art room in The National Museum in Bangkok.

Restoration

Borobudur attracted attention in 1885, when the Dutch engineer , Chairman of the Archaeological Society in Yogyakarta, made a discovery about the hidden foot. Photographs that reveal reliefs on the hidden foot were made in 1890–1891. The discovery led the Dutch East Indies government to take steps to safeguard the monument. In 1900, the government set up a commission consisting of three officials to assess the monument: Jan Lourens Andries Brandes, an art historian, a Dutch army engineer officer, and Benjamin Willem van de Kamer, a construction engineer from the Department of Public Works.

In 1902, the commission submitted a threefold plan of proposal to the government. First, the immediate dangers should be avoided by resetting the corners, removing stones that endangered the adjacent parts, strengthening the first balustrades and restoring several niches, archways, stupas and the main dome. Second, after fencing off the courtyards, proper maintenance should be provided and drainage should be improved by restoring floors and spouts. Third, all loose stones should be removed, the monument cleared up to the first balustrades, disfigured stones removed and the main dome restored. The total cost was estimated at that time around 48,800 Dutch guilders.

The restoration then was carried out between 1907 and 1911, using the principles of anastylosis and led by Theodor van Erp. The first seven months of restoration were occupied with excavating the grounds around the monument to find missing Buddha heads and panel stones. Van Erp dismantled and rebuilt the upper three circular platforms and stupas. Along the way, Van Erp discovered more things he could do to improve the monument; he submitted another proposal, which was approved with the additional cost of 34,600 guilders. At first glance, Borobudur had been restored to its old glory. Van Erp went further by carefully reconstructing the chattra (three-tiered parasol) pinnacle on top of the main stupa. However, he later dismantled the chattra, citing that there were not enough original stones used in reconstructing the pinnacle, which means that the original design of Borobudur's pinnacle is actually unknown. The dismantled chattra now is stored in Karmawibhangga Museum, a few hundred meters north from Borobudur.

Due to the limited budget, the restoration had been primarily focused on cleaning the sculptures, and Van Erp did not solve the drainage problem. Within fifteen years, the gallery walls were sagging, and the reliefs showed signs of new cracks and deterioration. Van Erp used concrete from which alkali salts and calcium hydroxide leached and were transported into the rest of the construction. This caused some problems, so that a further thorough renovation was urgently needed.

Small restorations had been performed since then, but not sufficient for complete protection. During World War II and Indonesian National Revolution in 1945 to 1949, Borobudur restoration efforts were halted. The monument suffered further from the weather and drainage problems, which caused the earth core inside the temple to expand, pushing the stone structure and tilting the walls. By 1950s some parts of Borobudur were facing imminent danger of collapsing. In 1965, Indonesia asked the UNESCO for advice on ways to counteract the problem of weathering at Borobudur and other monuments. In 1968 Professor Soekmono, then head of the Archeological Service of Indonesia, launched his "Save Borobudur" campaign, in an effort to organize a massive restoration project.

In the late 1960s, the Indonesian government had requested from the international community a major renovation to protect the monument. In 1973, a master plan to restore Borobudur was created. Through an Agreement concerning the Voluntary Contributions to be Given for the Execution of the Project to Preserve Borobudur (Paris, 29 January 1973), 5 countries agreed to contribute to the restoration: Australia (AUD $200,000), Belgium (BEF fr.250,000), Cyprus (CYP £100,000), France (USD $77,500) and Germany (DEM DM 2,000,000). The Indonesian government and UNESCO then undertook the complete overhaul of the monument in a big restoration project between 1975 and 1982. In 1975, the actual work began. Over one million stones were dismantled and removed during the restoration, and set aside like pieces of a massive jig-saw puzzle to be individually identified, catalogued, cleaned and treated for preservation. Borobudur became a testing ground for new conservation techniques, including new procedures to battle the microorganisms attacking the stone. The foundation was stabilized, and all 1,460 panels were cleaned. The restoration involved the dismantling of the five square platforms and the improvement of drainage by embedding water channels into the monument. Both impermeable and filter layers were added. This colossal project involved around 600 people to restore the monument and cost a total of US$6,901,243.

After the renovation was finished, UNESCO listed Borobudur as a World Heritage Site in 1991. It is listed under Cultural criteria (i) "to represent a masterpiece of human creative genius", (ii) "to exhibit an important interchange of human values, over a span of time or within a cultural area of the world, on developments in architecture or technology, monumental arts, town-planning or landscape design", and (vi) "to be directly or tangibly associated with events or living traditions, with ideas, or with beliefs, with artistic and literary works of outstanding universal significance".

In December 2017, the idea to reinstall chattra on top of Borobudur main stupa's yasthi has been revisited. However, expert said a thorough study is needed on restoring the umbrella-shaped pinnacle. By early 2018, the chattra restoration has not yet commenced.

Contemporary events

Religious ceremony
Following the major 1973 renovation funded by UNESCO, Borobudur is once again used as a place of worship and pilgrimage. Once a year, during the full moon in May or June, Buddhists in Indonesia observe Vesak day commemorating the birth, death, and the time when Siddhārtha Gautama attained the highest wisdom to become the Lord Buddha. Waisak is an official national holiday in Indonesia, and the ceremony is centered at the three Buddhist temples by walking from Mendut to Pawon and ending at Borobudur.

Tourism

The monument is the single most visited tourist attraction in Indonesia. In 1974, 260,000 tourists, of whom 36,000 were foreigners, visited the monument. The figure climbed to  visitors annually (80% were domestic tourists) in the mid-1990s, before the country's economic crisis. Tourism development, however, has been criticized for not including the local community, giving rise to occasional conflicts. In 2003, residents and small businesses around Borobudur organized several meetings and poetry protests, objecting to a provincial government plan to build a three-storey mall complex, dubbed the "Java World".

International tourism awards were given to Borobudur archaeological park, such as PATA Grand Pacific Award 2004, PATA Gold Award Winner 2011, and PATA Gold Award Winner 2012. In June 2012, Borobudur was recorded in the Guinness Book of World Records as the world's largest Buddhist archaeological site.

Conservation
UNESCO identified three specific areas of concern under the present state of conservation: (i) vandalism by visitors; (ii) soil erosion in the south-eastern part of the site; and (iii) analysis and restoration of missing elements. The soft soil, the numerous earthquakes and heavy rains lead to the destabilization of the structure. Earthquakes are by far the most important contributing factors, since not only do stones fall down and arches crumble, but the earth itself can move in waves, further destroying the structure. The increasing popularity of the stupa brings in many visitors, most of whom are from Indonesia. Despite warning signs on all levels not to touch anything, the regular transmission of warnings over loudspeakers and the presence of guards, vandalism on reliefs and statues is a common occurrence and problem, leading to further deterioration. As of 2009, there is no system in place to limit the number of visitors allowed per day or to introduce mandatory guided tours only.

In August 2014, the Conservation Authority of Borobudur reported some severe abrasion of the stone stairs caused by the scraping of visitors' footwear. The conservation authority planned to install wooden stairs to cover and protect the original stone stairs, just like those installed in Angkor Wat.

Rehabilitation

Borobudur was heavily affected by the eruption of Mount Merapi in October and November 2010. The temple complex was closed from 5 to 9 November to clean up the ashfall.

UNESCO donated US$3 million as a part of the costs towards the rehabilitation of Borobudur after Mount Merapi's 2010 eruption. More than 55,000 stone blocks comprising the temple's structure were dismantled to restore the drainage system, which had been clogged by slurry after the rain. The restoration was finished in November.

In January 2012, two German stone-conservation experts spent ten days at the site analyzing the temples and making recommendations to ensure their long-term preservation. In June, Germany agreed to contribute $130,000 to UNESCO for the second phase of rehabilitation, in which six experts in stone conservation, microbiology, structural engineering and chemical engineering would spend a week in Borobudur in June, then return for another visit in September or October. These missions would launch the preservation activities recommended in the January report and would include capacity building activities to enhance the preservation capabilities of governmental staff and young conservation experts.

On 14 February 2014, major tourist attractions in Yogyakarta and Central Java, including Borobudur, Prambanan and Ratu Boko, were closed to visitors, after being severely affected by the volcanic ash from the eruption of Kelud volcano in East Java, located around 200 kilometers east from Yogyakarta. Workers covered the iconic stupas and statues of Borobudur temple to protect the structure from volcanic ash. The Kelud volcano erupted on 13 February 2014 with an explosion heard as far away as Yogyakarta.

Security threats

On 21 January 1985, nine stupas were badly damaged by nine bombs. In 1991, a blind Muslim preacher, Husein Ali Al Habsyie, was sentenced to life imprisonment for masterminding a series of bombings in the mid-1980s, including the temple attack. Two other members of the Islamic extremist group that carried out the bombings were each sentenced to 20 years in 1986, and another man received a 13-year prison term.

On 27 May 2006, an earthquake of 6.2 magnitude struck the south coast of Central Java. The event caused severe damage around the region and casualties to the nearby city of Yogyakarta and Prambanan, but Borobudur remained intact.

In August 2014, Indonesian police and security forces tightened the security in and around Borobudur temple compound, as a precaution to a threat posted on social media by a self-proclaimed Indonesian branch of ISIS, citing that the terrorists planned to destroy Borobudur and other statues in Indonesia. The security improvements included the repair and increased deployment of CCTV monitors and the implementation of a night patrol in and around the temple compound. The jihadist group follows a strict interpretation of Islam that condemns any anthropomorphic representations such as sculptures as idolatry.

Visitor overload problem

The high volume of visitors ascending the Borobudur's narrow stairs, has caused a severe wear out on the stone of the stairs, eroding the stones surface and made them thinner and smoother. Overall, Borobudur has 2,033 surfaces of stone stairs, spread over four cardinal directions; including the west side, the east, south and north. There are around 1,028 surfaces of them, or about 49.15 percent, that are severely worn out.

To avoid further wear of stairs' stones, since November 2014, two main sections of Borobudur stairs – the eastern (ascending route) and northern (descending route) sides – are covered with wooden structures. The similar technique has been applied in Angkor Wat in Cambodia and Egyptian Pyramids. In March 2015, Borobudur Conservation Center proposed further to seal the stairs with rubber cover. Proposals have also been made that visitors be issued special sandals.

Architecture
The archaeological excavation into Borobudur during reconstruction suggests that adherents of Hinduism or a pre-Indic faith had already begun to erect a large structure on Borobudur's hill before the site was appropriated by Buddhists. The foundations are unlike any Hindu or Buddhist shrine structures, and therefore, the initial structure is considered more indigenous Javanese than Hindu or Buddhist.

Design

Borobudur is built as a single large stupa and, when viewed from above, takes the form of a giant tantric Buddhist mandala, simultaneously representing the Buddhist cosmology and the nature of mind. It has nine platforms, of which the lower six are square and the upper three are circular. The upper platform contains seventy-two small stupas surrounding one large central stupa. Each stupa is bell-shaped and pierced by numerous decorative openings. Statues of the Buddha sit inside the pierced enclosures.

The design of Borobudur took the form of a step pyramid. Previously, the prehistoric Austronesian megalithic culture in Indonesia had constructed several earth mounds and stone step pyramid structures called punden berundak as discovered in Pangguyangan site near Cisolok and in Cipari near Kuningan. The construction of stone pyramids is based on native beliefs that mountains and high places are the abode of ancestral spirits or hyangs. The punden berundak step pyramid is the basic design in Borobudur, believed to be the continuation of older megalithic tradition incorporated with Mahayana Buddhist ideas and symbolism.

The monument's three divisions symbolize the three "realms" of Buddhist cosmology, namely Kamadhatu (the world of desires), Rupadhatu (the world of forms), and finally Arupadhatu (the formless world). Ordinary sentient beings live out their lives on the lowest level, the realm of desire. Those who have burnt out all desire for continued existence leave the world of desire and live in the world on the level of form alone: they see forms but are not drawn to them. Finally, full Buddhas go beyond even form and experience reality at its purest, most fundamental level, the formless ocean of nirvāṇa. The liberation from the cycle of saṃsāra where the enlightened soul had no longer attached to worldly form corresponds to the concept of sūnyatā, the complete voidness or the nonexistence of the self. Kāmadhātu is represented by the base, Rupadhatu by the five square platforms (the body), and Arupadhatu by the three circular platforms and the large topmost stupa. The architectural features between the three stages have metaphorical differences. For instance, square and detailed decorations in the Rupadhatu disappear into plain circular platforms in the Arupadhatu to represent how the world of forms—where men are still attached with forms and names—changes into the world of the formless.

Congregational worship in Borobudur is performed in a walking pilgrimage. Pilgrims are guided by the system of staircases and corridors ascending to the top platform. Each platform represents one stage of enlightenment. The path that guides pilgrims was designed to symbolize Buddhist cosmology.

In 1885, a hidden structure under the base was accidentally discovered. The "hidden footing" contains reliefs, 160 of which are narratives describing the real Kāmadhātu. The remaining reliefs are panels with short inscriptions that apparently provide instructions for the sculptors, illustrating the scenes to be carved. The real base is hidden by an encasement base, the purpose of which remains a mystery. It was first thought that the real base had to be covered to prevent a disastrous subsidence of the monument into the hill. There is another theory that the encasement base was added because the original hidden footing was incorrectly designed, according to Vastu Shastra, the Indian ancient book about architecture and town planning. Regardless of why it was commissioned, the encasement base was built with detailed and meticulous design and with aesthetic and religious consideration.

Building structure

Approximately  of andesite stones were taken from neighbouring stone quarries to build the monument. The stone was cut to size, transported to the site and laid without mortar. Knobs, indentations and dovetails were used to form joints between stones. The roof of stupas, niches and arched gateways were constructed in corbelling method. Reliefs were created in situ after the building had been completed.

The monument is equipped with a good drainage system to cater to the area's high stormwater run-off. To prevent flooding, 100 spouts are installed at each corner, each with a unique carved gargoyle in the shape of a giant or makara.

Borobudur differs markedly from the general design of other structures built for this purpose. Instead of being built on a flat surface, Borobudur is built on a natural hill. However, construction technique is similar to other temples in Java. Without the inner spaces seen in other temples, and with a general design similar to the shape of pyramid, Borobudur was first thought more likely to have served as a stupa, instead of a temple. A stupa is intended as a shrine for the Buddha. Sometimes stupas were built only as devotional symbols of Buddhism. A temple, on the other hand, is used as a house of worship. The meticulous complexity of the monument's design suggests that Borobudur is in fact a temple.

Little is known about Gunadharma, the architect of the complex. His name is recounted from Javanese folk tales rather than from written inscriptions.

The basic unit of measurement used during construction was the tala, defined as the length of a human face from the forehead's hairline to the tip of the chin or the distance from the tip of the thumb to the tip of the middle finger when both fingers are stretched at their maximum distance. The unit is thus relative from one individual to the next, but the monument has exact measurements. A survey conducted in 1977 revealed frequent findings of a ratio of 4:6:9 around the monument. The architect had used the formula to lay out the precise dimensions of the fractal and self-similar geometry in Borobudur's design. This ratio is also found in the designs of Pawon and Mendut, nearby Buddhist temples. Archeologists have conjectured that the 4:6:9 ratio and the tala have calendrical, astronomical and cosmological significance, as is the case with the temple of Angkor Wat in Cambodia.

The main structure can be divided into three components: base, body, and top. The body is composed of five square platforms, each of diminishing height. The first terrace is set back  from the edge of the base. Each subsequent terrace is set back , leaving a narrow corridor at each stage. The top consists of three circular platforms, with each stage supporting a row of perforated stupas, arranged in concentric circles. Stairways at the center of each of the four sides give access to the top, with a number of arched gates overlooked by 32 lion statues. The gates are adorned with Kala's head carved on top of each and Makaras projecting from each side. This Kala-Makara motif is commonly found on the gates of Javanese temples. The main entrance is on the eastern side, the location of the first narrative reliefs. Stairways on the slopes of the hill also link the monument to the low-lying plain.

Reliefs

Borobudur is constructed in such a way that it reveals various levels of terraces, showing intricate architecture that goes from being heavily ornamented with bas-reliefs to being plain in Arupadhatu circular terraces. The first four terrace walls are showcases for bas-relief sculptures. These are exquisite, considered to be the most elegant and graceful in the ancient Buddhist world.

The bas-reliefs in Borobudur depicted many scenes of daily life in 8th-century ancient Java, from the courtly palace life, hermit in the forest, to those of commoners in the village. It also depicted temple, marketplace, various flora and fauna, and also native vernacular architecture. People depicted here are the images of king, queen, princes, noblemen, courtier, soldier, servant, commoners, priest and hermit. The reliefs also depicted spiritual beings in Buddhism such as asuras, gods, bodhisattvas, kinnaras, gandharvas and apsaras. The images depicted on bas-relief often served as reference for historians to research for certain subjects, such as the study of architecture, weaponry, economy, fashion, and also mode of transportation of 8th-century Maritime Southeast Asia. One of the famous renderings of an 8th-century Southeast Asian double outrigger ship is Borobudur Ship. Today, the actual-size replica of Borobudur Ship that had sailed from Indonesia to Africa in 2004 is displayed in the Samudra Raksa Museum, located a few hundred meters north of Borobudur.

The Borobudur reliefs also pay close attention to Indian aesthetic discipline, such as pose and gesture that contain certain meanings and aesthetic value. The reliefs of noblemen, noble women, kings, or divine beings such as apsaras, taras and boddhisattvas are usually portrayed in tribhanga pose, the three-bend pose on neck, hips, and knee, with one leg resting and one upholding the body weight. This position is considered as the most graceful pose, such as the figure of Surasundari holding a lotus.

During Borobudur excavation, archeologists discovered colour pigments of blue, red, green, black, as well as bits of gold foil, and concluded that the monument that we see today – a dark gray mass of volcanic stone, lacking in colour – was probably once coated with varjalepa white plaster and then painted with bright colors, serving perhaps as a beacon of Buddhist teaching. The same vajralepa plaster can also be found in Sari, Kalasan and Sewu temples. It is likely that the bas-reliefs of Borobudur was originally quite colourful, before centuries of torrential tropical rainfalls peeled-off the colour pigments.

Borobudur contains approximately 2,670 individual bas reliefs (1,460 narrative and 1,212 decorative panels), which cover the façades and balustrades.

The hidden foot contains the first series with 160 narrative panels, and the remaining 10 series are distributed throughout walls and balustrades in four galleries starting from the eastern entrance stairway to the left. Narrative panels on the wall read from right to left, while those on the balustrade read from left to right. This conforms with pradaksina, the ritual of circumambulation performed by pilgrims who move in a clockwise direction while keeping the sanctuary to their right.

The hidden foot depicts the workings of karmic law. The walls of the first gallery have two superimposed series of reliefs; each consists of 120 panels. The upper part depicts the biography of Lord Buddha, while the lower part of the wall and also the balustrades in the first and the second galleries tell the story of the Buddha's former lives. The remaining panels are devoted to Sudhana's further wandering about his search, terminated by his attainment of the Perfect Wisdom.

The law of karma (Karmawibhangga)

The 160 hidden panels do not form a continuous story, but each panel provides one complete illustration of cause and effect. There are depictions of blameworthy activities, from gossip to murder, with their corresponding punishments. There are also praiseworthy activities, that include charity and pilgrimage to sanctuaries, and their subsequent rewards. The pains of hell and the pleasure of heaven are also illustrated. There are scenes of daily life, complete with the full panorama of saṃsāra (the endless cycle of birth and death). The encasement base of the Borobudur temple was disassembled to reveal the hidden foot, and the reliefs were photographed by Casijan Chepas in 1890. It is these photographs that are displayed in Borobudur Museum (Karmawibhangga Museum), located just several hundred meters north of the temple. During the restoration, the foot encasement was reinstalled, covering the Karmawibhangga reliefs. Today, only the southeast corner of the hidden foot is revealed and visible for visitors.

The story of Prince Siddhartha and the birth of Buddha (Lalitavistara)

The story starts with the descent of the Buddha from the Tushita heaven and ends with his first sermon in the Deer Park at Sarnath. The relief shows the birth of the Buddha as Prince Siddhartha, son of King Suddhodana and Queen Maya of Kapilavastu (in Nepal).

The birth is preceded by 27 panels showing various preparations, in the heavens and on the earth, to welcome the final incarnation of the bodhisattva. Before descending from Tushita heaven, the Bodhisattva entrusted his crown to his successor, the future Buddha Maitreya. He descended on earth in the shape of a white elephant with six tusks, and penetrated to Queen Maya's right womb. Queen Maya had a dream of this event, which was interpreted that his son would become either a sovereign or a Buddha.

While Queen Maya felt that it was the time to give birth, she went to the Lumbini park near Kapilavastu. She stood under a sal tree (Shorea robusta), holding one branch with her right hand, and she gave birth to a son, Prince Siddhartha, from her side. The story on the panels continues until the Sermon in the Deer Park at Sarnath, his first sermon after his Enlightenment.

The stories of Buddha's previous life (Jataka) and other legendary people (Avadana)

Jatakas are stories about the Buddha before he was born as Prince Siddhartha. They are the stories that tell about the previous lives of the Buddha, in both human and animal form. The future Buddha may appear in them as a king, an outcast, a god, an elephant—but, in whatever form, he exhibits some virtue that the tale thereby inculcates. Avadanas are similar to jatakas, but the main figure is not the Bodhisattva himself. The saintly deeds in avadanas are attributed to other legendary persons. Jatakas and avadanas are treated in one and the same series in the reliefs of Borobudur.

The first twenty lower panels in the first gallery on the wall depict the Sudhanakumaravadana, or the saintly deeds of Sudhana. The first 135 upper panels in the same gallery on the balustrades are devoted to the 34 legends of the Jatakamala. The remaining 237 panels depict stories from other sources, as do the lower series and panels in the second gallery. Some jatakas are depicted twice, for example the story of King Sibhi (Rama's forefather).

Sudhana's search for the ultimate truth (Gandavyuha)

Gandavyuha is the story told in the final chapter of the Avatamsaka Sutra about Sudhana's tireless wandering in search of the Highest Perfect Wisdom. It covers two galleries (third and fourth) and also half of the second gallery, comprising in total of 460 panels. The principal figure of the story, the youth Sudhana, son of an extremely rich merchant, appears on the 16th panel. The preceding 15 panels form a prologue to the story of the miracles during Buddha's samadhi in the Garden of Jeta at Sravasti.

Sudhana was instructed by Manjusri to meet the monk Megasri, his first spiritual friend. As his journey continues, Sudhana meets 53 teachers, such as Supratisthita, the physician Megha (Spirit of Knowledge), the banker Muktaka, the monk Saradhvaja, the upasika Asa (Spirit of Supreme Enlightenment), Bhismottaranirghosa, the Brahmin Jayosmayatna, Princess Maitrayani, the monk Sudarsana, a boy called Indriyesvara, the upasika Prabhuta, the banker Ratnachuda, King Anala, the god Siva Mahadeva, Queen Maya, Bodhisattva Maitreya and then back to Manjusri. Each spiritual friend gives Sudhana specific teachings, knowledge, and wisdom. These meetings are shown in the third gallery.

After a second meeting with Manjusri, Sudhana went to the residence of Bodhisattva Samantabhadra, depicted in the fourth gallery. The entire series of the fourth gallery is devoted to the teaching of Samantabhadra. The narrative panels finally end with Sudhana's achievement of the Supreme Knowledge and the Ultimate Truth.

Buddha statues

Apart from the story of the Buddhist cosmology carved in stone, Borobudur has many statues of various Buddhas. The cross-legged statues are seated in a lotus position and distributed on the five square platforms (the Rupadhatu level), as well as on the top platform (the Arupadhatu level).

The Buddha statues are in niches at the Rupadhatu level, arranged in rows on the outer sides of the balustrades, the number of statues decreasing as platforms progressively diminish to the upper level. The first balustrades have 104 niches, the second 104, the third 88, the fourth 72 and the fifth 64. In total, there are 432 Buddha statues at the Rupadhatu level. At the Arupadhatu level (or the three circular platforms), Buddha statues are placed inside perforated stupas. The first circular platform has 32 stupas, the second 24 and the third 16, which adds up to 72 stupas. Of the original 504 Buddha statues, over 300 are damaged (mostly headless), and 43 are missing. Since the monument's discovery, heads have been acquired by museums (mostly Western) or looted by personal collectors. Some of these Buddha heads are now displayed in numbers of museums, such as the Tropenmuseum in Amsterdam, Musée Guimet in Paris, and The British Museum in London. Germany has in 2014 returned its collection and funded their reattachment and further conservation of the site.

At first glance, all the Buddha statues appear similar, but there is a subtle difference between them in the mudras, or the position of the hands. There are five groups of mudra: North, East, South, West and Zenith, which represent the five cardinal compass points according to Mahayana. The first four balustrades have the first four mudras: North, East, South and West, of which the Buddha statues that face one compass direction have the corresponding mudra. Buddha statues at the fifth balustrades and inside the 72 stupas on the top platform have the same mudra: Zenith. Each mudra represents one of the Five Dhyani Buddhas; each has its own symbolism.

Following the order of Pradakshina (clockwise circumumbulation) starting from the East, the mudras of the Borobudur buddha statues are:

Legacy

The aesthetic and technical mastery of Borobudur, and also its sheer size, has evoked the sense of grandeur and pride for Indonesians. Just like Angkor Wat for Cambodia, Borobudur has become a powerful symbol for Indonesia — to testify for its past greatness. Indonesia's first President Sukarno made a point of showing the site to foreign dignitaries. The Suharto regime — realized its important symbolic and economic meanings — diligently embarked on a massive project to restore the monument with the help from UNESCO. Many museums in Indonesia contain a scale model replica of Borobudur. The monument has become almost an icon, grouped with the wayang puppet play and gamelan music into a vague classical Javanese past from which Indonesians are to draw inspiration.

Several archaeological relics taken from Borobudur or its replica have been displayed in some museums in Indonesia and abroad. Other than Karmawibhangga Museum within Borobudur temple ground, some museums boast to host relics of Borobudur, such as Indonesian National Museum in Jakarta, Tropenmuseum in Amsterdam, British Museum in London, and Thai National Museum in Bangkok. Louvre museum in Paris, Malaysian National Museum in Kuala Lumpur, and Museum of World Religions in New Taipei also displayed the replica of Borobudur. The monument has drawn global attention to the classical Buddhist civilization of ancient Java.

The rediscovery and reconstruction of Borobudur has been hailed by Indonesian Buddhists as the sign of the Buddhist revival in Indonesia. In 1934, Narada Thera, a missionary monk from Sri Lanka, visited Indonesia for the first time as part of his journey to spread the Dharma in Southeast Asia. This opportunity was used by a few local Buddhists to revive Buddhism in Indonesia. A Bodhi Tree planting ceremony was held in Southeastern side of Borobudur on 10 March 1934 under the blessing of Narada Thera, and some Upasakas were ordained as monks. Once a year, thousands of Buddhist from Indonesia and neighboring countries flock to Borobudur to commemorate national Waisak celebration.

The emblem of Central Java province and Magelang Regency bears the image of Borobudur. It has become the symbol of Central Java, and also Indonesia on a wider scale. Borobudur has become the name of several establishments, such as Borobudur University, Borobudur Hotel in Central Jakarta, and several Indonesian restaurants abroad. Borobudur has appeared on Rupiah banknotes and stamps and in numbers of books, publications, documentaries and Indonesian tourism promotion materials. The monument has become one of the main tourism attraction in Indonesia, vital for generating local economy in the region surrounding the temple. The tourism sector of the city of Yogyakarta for example, flourishes partly because of its proximity to Borobudur and Prambanan temples.

In Art and Literature
In her poetical illustration , to an engraving of a painting by W. Purser in Fisher's Drawing Room Scrap Book, 1836, Letitia Elizabeth Landon reflects on Borobudur from a Christian perspective.

Gallery

Gallery of reliefs

Gallery of Borobudur

See also

 Ancient monuments of Java
 Architecture of Indonesia
 Candi of Indonesia
 Trail of Civilizations
 Unfinished Buddha

Notes

References

Further reading

 
 
 

 
 Levin, Cecelia. "Enshrouded in Dharma and Artha: The Narrative Sequence of Borobudur's First Gallery Wall." In Materializing Southeast Asia's Past: Selected Papers from the 12th International Conference of the European Association of Southeast Asian Archaeologists, edited by Klokke Marijke J. and Degroot Véronique, 27-40. SINGAPORE: NUS Press, 2013. Accessed June 17, 2020. www.jstor.org/stable/j.ctv1qv3kf.7.
 Jaini, Padmanabh S. "The Story of Sudhana and Manoharā: An Analysis of the Texts and the Borobudur Reliefs." Bulletin of the School of Oriental and African Studies, University of London 29, no. 3 (1966): 533-58. Accessed June 17, 2020. www.jstor.org/stable/611473.
 Shastri, Bahadur Chand. “THE IDENTIFICATION OF THE FIRST SIXTEEN RELIEFS ON THE SECOND MAIN-WALL OF BARABUDUR.” Bijdragen Tot De Taal-, Land- En Volkenkunde Van Nederlandsch-Indië, vol. 89, no. 1, 1932, pp. 173–181. JSTOR, www.jstor.org/stable/20770599. Accessed 24 Apr. 2020.
 SUNDBERG, JEFFREY ROGER. "Considerations on the Dating of the Barabuḍur Stūpa." Bijdragen Tot De Taal-, Land- En Volkenkunde 162, no. 1 (2006): 95-132. Accessed June 17, 2020. www.jstor.org/stable/27868287.

External links

 Official site of Borobudur, Prambanan, and Ratu Boko Park
 Borobudur Conservation Center
 UNESCO Site
PBS page which talks about the hidden part of Borobudur, 160 reliefs buried.
 Borobudur Temple Compounds short documentary by UNESCO and NHK
 Wonderful Indonesia's Guide on Borobudur
 Learning From Borobudur documentary about Borobudur's bas-reliefs stories of Jatakas, Lalitavistara and Gandavyuha in YouTube
 Australian National University's research project on Borobudur
 Analysis of Borobudur's hidden base
 Explore Borobudur on Global Heritage Network
 Photographs of Borobudur Stupa
 "Yogyakarta. Temple Ruins: Details of Sculpted Figures" is a photograph with commentary by Frank G. Carpenter.
 Wacana Nusantara
 Borobudur, Hening dalam Keagungan

 
Lost ancient cities and towns
820s establishments
9th-century establishments in Indonesia
9th-century Buddhist temples
Archaeoastronomy
Archaeological sites in Indonesia
Buddhist pilgrimage sites in Indonesia
Buddhist temples in Indonesia
Former Buddhist temples
Pyramids in Indonesia
Shailendra dynasty
World Heritage Sites in Indonesia
Cultural Properties of Indonesia in Central Java
Tourist attractions in Central Java
Religious buildings and structures in Central Java
Buddhist relics